The Men's 4x400m Relay event at the 2010 South American Games was held on March 23 at 19:15.

Medalists

Records

Results
Results were published.

See also
2010 South American Under-23 Championships in Athletics

References

External links
Report

4x400 M